FGG may refer to:
 Fairfield Greenwich Group, an American investment firm
 Federation of Gay Games
 Fibrinogen gamma chain
 Foundation for God's Glory, an American charity
 "FGG", a song by Susumu Hirasawa from The Ghost in Science